Gloucester Friary may refer to:

Blackfriars, Gloucester (Dominican)
Greyfriars, Gloucester (Franciscan)
Whitefriars, Gloucester (Carmelite)